Shabazz Palaces is an American hip hop group from Seattle led by Ishmael Butler a.k.a. Palaceer Lazaro (formerly Butterfly of jazz rap group Digable Planets). Much of the Butler's work as Shabazz Palaces has been made in collaboration with multi-instrumentalist Tendai "Baba" Maraire, son of mbira master Dumisani Maraire. Active since 2009, Shabazz Palaces has released five studio albums on Sub Pop after self-releasing two EPs. Their most recent album, The Don of Diamond Dreams, was released on April 17, 2020.

Biography
Two anonymously self-released EPs titled Shabazz Palaces and Of Light in 2009 led to Shabazz Palaces becoming the first hip-hop act to be signed to Sub Pop. Their debut full-length album, Black Up, was released in 2011 to widespread critical acclaim. Black Up was listed #1 in Seattle Times music columnist Andrew Matson's "Local Top #10" of 2011.

Their sophomore album, Lese Majesty, was released on July 29, 2014 after being premiered at Seattle's Pacific Science Center Laser Dome.

In 2017, Shabazz Palaces released its third and fourth full-length records concurrently. Quazarz: Born on a Gangster Star and Quazarz vs. The Jealous Machines were accompanied by a short film directed by Nep Sidhu, and a limited-run comic book illustrated by Joshua Ray Stephens. 

In 2018, Shabazz Palaces joined up with frequent collaborator Erik Blood to release a full-length LP titled 1 Time Mirage under the moniker Knife Knights, originally a moniker used by Butler for his collaborative production work with Blood on previous Shabazz Palaces records, though now formalised as a touring band signed to Sub Pop. 

Shabazz Palaces' fifth full-length record, The Don of Diamond Dreams, was released in 2020.

Collaborations 
Shabazz Palaces' collaborations include guest features with or from Flying Lotus, Thundercat, Theesatisfaction, Stas THEE Boss, Erik Blood, clipping., Battles, The Helio Sequence, Porter Ray, Sunny Levine and Carlos Overall. One notable collaboration is the supergroup WOKE, formed with Flying Lotus and Thundercat, which released one single, "The Lavishments of Light Looking", featuring George Clinton.

Chimurenga Renaissance is a project led by Maraire, in collaboration with guitarist Hussein Kalonji and with contributions from Butler. The project released a mixtape, Pungwe, in 2012, and published it as an album on March 5, 2013. They released their full-length debut album riZe vadZimu riZe on March 25, 2014. Two EPs followed: Kudada Nekuva Munhu Mutema on February 3, 2015, and Girlz With Gunz on February 5, 2016.

Shabazz Palaces form part of the Black Constellation, a Seattle-based collective including visual artists, fashion designers, and musicians.

An April 2020 article on The Don of Diamond Dreams confirmed that Tendai Maraire was no longer part of Shabazz Palaces.

Style and influences
Butler notes that the work of Shabazz Palaces differs from his previous work stylistically. He cites his primary influences as "abstract", pulling from podcasts and mixtapes. Butler attributes the use of African percussion and jazz overtones to his family's musical preferences.

Discography

Studio albums
 Black Up (2011)
 Lese Majesty (2014)
 Quazarz: Born on a Gangster Star (2017)
 Quazarz vs. The Jealous Machines (2017)
 The Don of Diamond Dreams (2020)

References

External links

Sub Pop Records: Shabazz Palaces

West Coast hip hop groups
Hip hop duos
Sub Pop artists
American musical duos
Alternative hip hop groups
Five percenters
American experimental musical groups
Musical groups from Seattle
Musical groups established in 2009
Rappers from Seattle
Third Man Records artists
2009 establishments in Washington (state)